The Prix Carbet de la Caraïbe et du Tout-Monde (or, the Prix Carbet of the Caribbean and Tout-Monde) is an annual award given to the best literary work in French or French Creole from the Caribbean and the Americas.

History 

The Prix Carbet de la Caraïbe et du Tout-Monde was founded at the initiative of the Carbet journal in 1990. It aims to promote creole writing and to contribute to a better understanding of the processes of creolization. It rewards works depicting the unity and diversity of the cultures of the Caribbean and the Americas. It is awarded annually in December. As of 2013 it is worth €5000.

Between 1994 and 2006, the prize was administered by Gérard Delver and the Association Tout-Monde de Guadeloupe. From 2007, it has been administered by the Institut du Tout-Monde.

The prize ceremony rotates between Guadeloupe, French Guiana, Martinique and Île-de-France.

Rules 

Works in any genre are acceptable to compete for the award. They should have been published between 1 October of the previous year and 30 September of the year of award. They should have been written either in French or Creole, or translated into these languages. The deadline for submission is 1 October of the year of award.

The jury meets in camera in December, and the announcement of the award is made the same month.

Jury 

From inception till 2011, the prize was managed by Edouard Glissant, who selected and presided over the jury. In 2011, Patrick Chamoiseau was elected as the president of the prize.

From 1989 to 2009,  was one of the members of the jury.

Since 2013, the jury has been composed of:

Ernest Pépin (Guadeloupe), Jury President
Patrick Chamoiseau (Martinique)
 Rodolphe Alexandre (French Guiana)
Michael Dash (Trinidad)
Samia Kassab-Charfi (Tunisia)
Diva Damato Barbaro (Brazil)
Miguel Duplan (Martinique)
Lise Gauvin (Quebec)
Nancy Morejon (Cuba)
Romuald Fonkoua (Paris)
Évelyne Trouillot (Haiti)

Controversy 

In 2009, Edouard Glissant and the award committee announced that they would give the prize not to a book or an oeuvre of an author, but rather for a "lifetime of work, possibly to the work of the spirit", and awarded it to an anti-colonial civil servant, Alain Plénel. The decision raised questions about the suitability of a politician for a literary award.

Winners

References 

French fiction awards
Awards established in 1990